False goat's beard is a common name for several plants and may refer to:

Astilbe, native to Asia and North America
Sorbaria sorbifolia, native to Asia